UVT Agroland Timișoara, is a professional women's volleyball club based in Timișoara, Romania, that competed in the CEV Challenge Cup.

Team

Current squad
Squad for the 2018–19 season 
  Diana Cărbuneanu
  Roxana Iancu
  Andreea Petra  
  Marisa Radu
  Daniela Lupescu 
  Larisa Vasilică
  Sorina Miclăuș
  Anca Mănuc  
  Cybill Catargiu
  Maëva Orlé  
  Teodora Pušić 
  Katarina Jovanović
  Barbora Koseková

References

External links

CEV profile
Voleiromania profile

Romanian volleyball clubs
Timișoara
2014 establishments in Romania
Volleyball clubs established in 2014